It's a Girl may refer to:

 A phrase based on sex assignment
 It's a Girl! (album), the only album by Sweet Baby
 "It's a Girl", a 2002 two-part episode of The Hughleys
 It's a Girl: The Three Deadliest Words in the World, a documentary film

See also
 It's a Boy (disambiguation)